The Rebels may refer to:

Novels
 The Rebels (Sándor Márai novel) (Hungarian title: A zendülők), a 1930 novel by Sándor Márai
 The Rebels (John Jakes novel), a 1975 historical novel by John Jakes

Film and TV
 The Rebels, an American comedy-drama pilot on Amazon Studios
 The Rebels (TV series), a 1976 American television series
 The Rebels (1972 film), also known as Quelques arpents de neige, a Canadian drama film by Denis Héroux
 The Rebels (1979 film), a 1979 American television film based on the Jakes novel

Music
 The Rebels (rockabilly band), an American rockabilly band
 The Rebels (surf band), an American surf music band
 The Rebels, backing band of American musician Prince that evolved into The Revolution
 "The Rebels", a 1996 song by The Cranberries from To the Faithful Departed
 The Rebels, the continuation of New Zealand band Larry's Rebels after Larry's departure

See also
 The Rebel (disambiguation)
 Rebel (disambiguation)